Alphonse Hubert François Balat (15 May 1818 – 16 September 1895) was a Belgian architect.

Life
Balat was born in Gochenée.  He studied at the Academie of Namur and obtained his degree in architecture from the Academy of Antwerp in 1838.
In 1839 he stayed in Paris for a year but returned after his father's death. He was soon discovered by the Walloon nobility for which he built or renovated a number of 'Château's' (amongst others Castle of Jehay-Bodegnée, Castle of Presles). Stylistically these constructions often contained renaissance elements with a neoclassical stress. In his interior designs he also used elements from the Louis XV and Louis XVI styles.

In 1846 Balat settled in Brussels. His was introduced to the Belgian royal family after he was noticed for his design of a temporary festive decoration for the Salle de la Madeleine (Magdalenamarkt) where the royal family had been present (1848). In 1851 and 1856 he created several temporary festive decorations for the monarchy. In 1852 he was appointed as the architect of the Duke of Brabant, the later king Leopold II of Belgium. In 1856 he constructed the town palace (Hôtel) of the Marquess of Assche (Asse) in the newly planned district called 'Quartier Léopold'. It was noticed for its austere classical Neo-Renaissance facade inspired by Michelangelo's Palazzo Farnese in Rome. His rather sober classical approach was rare at that time when excessively decorated facades and interiors were much preferred . During his career he built a large number of private residences. Most of them were demolished during the 20th century.

After Leopold II ascended the throne in 1865, Balat became his principal architect. Balat made a number of designs for the sumptuous reception rooms of the Royal Palace of Belgium such as the 'Throne Room', 'The Grand Staircase', and the 'Grande Galerie'. For this realisations he greatly followed the example of the French Royal residences. Balat realised the facade on the back of the palace and the facades of the courtyards. His design for the principal facade of the palace is deeply influenced by the work of the French architect Ange-Jacques Gabriel. It was not executed during Balat's lifetime and later completed in an altered form by Henri Maquet.

Balat died at Ixelles, aged 76, and was buried in the Laeken Cemetery.

Royal Greenhouses of Laeken

His most successful architectural project are the Royal Greenhouses of Laeken. It consists of a huge complex of several dome-shaped buildings in iron and glass that are connected by glass-roofed galleries. The centerpiece is the domed 'Grand Jardin d'hiver' which is a circular interpretation of the Palm House of the Royal Botanic Gardens, Kew.
Working with new materials like iron and glass, Balat was obliged to abandon his 'classical' stance. This stimulated the imagination of the architect. In the steel constructions he introduced decorative motifs derived from plants and flowers. This formed a first step towards Art Nouveau architecture that was further developed by Victor Horta who served as an apprentice of Balat.

Honours 
 1881: Grand Officer in the Order of Leopold.
 1862 : Member of the Royal Academie.

Works

For Leopold II of Belgium:
 Royal Palace of Brussels, Brussels (1866–1874) : Grand Staircase, decoration of divers room, Throne Room, back facade, several projects for the principal facade.
 Royal Castle of Laeken : manège (1873–1874), new entrance gate (1879–1880), restoration after the fire (1890)
 Royal Greenhouses of Laeken (1874–1890)
 Royal Museums of Fine Arts of Belgium (1875–1880), rue de la Régence/Regentschapsstraat, Brussels.
 Royal Castle of Ardenne (near Houyet), later converted into a luxury hotel. (1874-)
 Royal Castle of Ciergnon (near Houyet).
 Project for a 'Panthéon National', in Koekelberg (1880 - not realised), (colossal ionic temple)
 Facade of the Royal Castle of Ciergnon (1880)
 Project for the 'Montagne de la Cour', today called 'Mont des Arts'/'Kunstberg' in Brussels(1882, not realised)
For other private patrons:
 Transformations on the Castle of Jehay-Bodegnée
 Castle of Warfusée in Saint-Georges-sur-Meuse : facade in Louis XV of France style and interior decoration (1840)
 Château Saint-Marc, near Namur : facade
 Château de Seilles-lez-Andenne
 Castle of  : exterior renovation.
 Château de Presles (1855)
 Gentilhommière à Dave (1858)
 Palace of Charles Vander Noot, Marquess of Assche, rue de la Science, 33 (today square Frère Orban) Brussels (1856–1858)
 Transformation of the Opheylissem abbey into a 'château de plaisance' (dome)(1870)
 Reconstruction of the Castle of Freÿr after the fire (since 1875)
 Transformations on the Castle of Mirwart
Other projects:
 Festive decoration of the salle de la Madeleine in Brussels (1848)
 Festive decoration of the 'salle du palais ducal' in Brussels (1851) and (1856).
 'Victoria Regia' greenhouse in the Zoo of Brussels (Leopold Park). Moved to the National Botanic Garden of Belgium in Meise. (Bouchout Castle)

Gallery

Bibliography

 Bordiau, G., Notice sur Alphonse Balat, in Annuaire de l'Académie Royale des Sciences des Lettres et des Beaux-Arts de Belgique, Brussels, 1903, pp. 129–148.
 Clément, J., Alphonse Balat. Architecte du roi (1819-1895), Palais des Académies, Brussels, 1956.
 Martiny, V.G., 'Balat, Alphonse' in Biographie nationale'''', Brussels, 1971, kol. 15–18.
 Poelaert en zijn tijd/Poelaert et son temps (exhib. cat.), Gemeentekrediet/Crédit communal, Brussels, 1980, pp. 199–209.
 Vandeweerdt, Dirk, Kunstgeschiedenis, architectuur en beeldhouwkunst, deel 6 in Culturele Geschiedenis van Vlaanderen, Baert, s.l., 1980.
 Goedleven, E., Fornari, B. en Vandenbreeden, J., De Koninklijke Serres van Laken, Lannoo, Tielt, 1988.
 Smets, Irène, De Koninklijke Serres te Laken'', Ludion, Ghent, 2001.

References

1818 births
1895 deaths
Royal Academy of Fine Arts (Antwerp) alumni
Members of the Royal Academy of Belgium
Burials at Laeken Cemetery
19th-century Belgian architects